Griese may refer to:

 Bob Griese (born 1945), American football quarterback
 Brian Griese (born 1975), American football quarterback
 Friedrich Griese (1890–1975), German novelist
 Kerstin Griese (born 1966), German politician
 River Griese, a river in County Kildare, Ireland